Pseudoalteromonas denitrificans is a marine bacterium.

References

External links

Type strain of Pseudoalteromonas denitrificans at BacDive -  the Bacterial Diversity Metadatabase

Alteromonadales
Bacteria described in 1987